Powerback is used by aircraft to move backwards on the ground using the power of their engines along with the aircraft's thrust reversal. Propeller driven (turboprop) aircraft tend to use powerbacks as a means of reversing; powerbacking is often prohibited by the manufacturer on jet aircraft (with the exception of some jet aircraft with tail mounted engines).

Background
While many aircraft are physically capable of performing powerbacks, many companies impose restrictions on the practice, mainly due to the risk of FOD (foreign object damage) from debris propelled into the air.  This problem is magnified even more with planes having wing-mounted engines, as their proximity to the ground can exacerbate debris ingestion if powerbacks are used. Small metal objects are particularly dangerous as they can be propelled into terminal windows, employees on the ground or even the aircraft itself. Applying the brakes when backing up also has the potential to cause a tailstrike.

During the 1980s, many aircraft with aft-mounted engines, such as DC-9s, Boeing 727s, and MD-80s used powerbacks to reduce the number of ground personnel required.
For example, Northwest Airlines' fleet of DC-9 aircraft used powerback operations at certain airports, but discontinued the practice in 2005 citing the need to conserve fuel. KLM also avoids using the procedure for the same reasons, noting that powerbacks cause extra wear on the engines.

In addition, in the United States, restrictions on powerbacks are enforced by the FAA, and the local aviation officials. Only certain gates at certain airports are approved for powerbacks, and are usually placarded as such. Many airlines impose stricter safety procedures for powerbacks, which often include disallowing a powerback under certain environmental conditions, such as rain or snow.

Military use
In several US military aircraft such as the C-130 Hercules, the C-5 Galaxy and the C-17 Globemaster III, the powerback operation is used to enhance ground maneuverability during taxi operations.

References

See also 
 Pushback
 Taxiing
 Thrust reversal
 Air Florida Flight 90

Aircraft operations